Le Serpent may refer to:

French films
 Le Serpent (1973 film), released in English as Night Flight from Moscow
 Le Serpent (2006 film), released in English as The Serpent

See also
 Serpent (disambiguation)